The Mason Building is a historic commercial building in Huntsville, Alabama.  It was built by the owners of Mason's Furniture, which was founded in 1908. In 1927, they built a new building which they intended to lease to other tenants.  It was designed to be built in stages, and be up to five stories tall, but only the first two were ever built.  Sears Roebuck began leasing the building in March 1929, at which time a mezzanine and elevator were added.  Sears left Huntsville in 1931 in the midst of the Great Depression, and Mason's moved their store into the building.  The company operated until 1977; since then, the building has housed a number of businesses, including a pub.

The façade is clad in terra cotta tiles, with piers at the corners extending above the cornice.  The ground floor has large glass panes and a recessed central entrance.  A terra cotta band painted with a wave pattern separates the ground floor from the mezzanine-level windows, three in each bay.  The mezzanine and second floor are separated by stepped rows of tiles, a wider band which originally featured a scalloped molding with a bell design, two rows of dentils (small then large), and a cornice.  The second floor is divided by two wide piers, with two multi-light casement windows in the outer bays and three in the middle.  The simple cornice and piers extending above it are a by-product of the intended five-story design being cut short.

The building was listed on the National Register of Historic Places in 1980.

References

National Register of Historic Places in Huntsville, Alabama
Commercial buildings on the National Register of Historic Places in Alabama
Commercial buildings completed in 1927
Buildings and structures in Huntsville, Alabama